Hidden Love is a 2007 Italian-Belgian drama film directed by Alessandro Capone and starring Isabelle Huppert.

Cast
 Isabelle Huppert as Danielle
 Greta Scacchi as Dr. Dubois
 Mélanie Laurent as Sophie
 Olivier Gourmet as Morris
 Jean-Michel Larre as Luc
 Giorgio Lupano as Sébastien

See also
 Isabelle Huppert on screen and stage

References

External links

2007 films
2000s French-language films
2007 drama films
Films directed by Alessandro Capone
Italian drama films
Belgian drama films
French-language Belgian films
2000s Italian films